Sky Aviation was an airline based in Sierra Leone.

Fleet

As of August 2006 the Sky Aviation fleet included:

1 Boeing 707-320B
2 Boeing 707-320C

Previously operated:
It did acquire a Boeing 747SP early in January 2003, but was transferred to Kinshasa Airways later the same month.

References

Airlines banned in the European Union
Defunct airlines of Sierra Leone
Airlines disestablished in 2006